A by-election was held on 31 July 2016 to fill vacancies in four districts of the Tokyo Metropolitan Assembly. The elections were held simultaneously with the gubernatorial election. Nominations for the election were announced on 22 July 2016. Liberal Democratic Party candidates won all four elections.

Ota district
The Ota district, which corresponds with Ota city, elects eight members to the 127-member assembly. Ken Tanaka, a second-term Democratic Party member who placed 1st in the 2009 election and 7th in the 2013 election, resigned from his seat in the assembly to contest the next national general election. In the closest contest of the four districts, LDP candidate Hiroyuki Yamamori defeated Democratic Party candidate Ai Mori by 4,141 votes (1.32%).

Shibuya district
The Shibuya district, which corresponds with Shibuya city, elects two members to the assembly. Liberal Democrat Hideko Murakami, who was serving her fourth term in the assembly since being first elected in the November 2003 by-election, resigned from the assembly to contest the Shibuya mayoral election that was held on 26 April 2015, in which she placed third.

Shinjuku district
The Shinjuku district, which corresponds with Shinjuku city, elects four members to the 127-member assembly. Kenichi Yoshizumi resigned from the assembly to contest the November 2014 Shinjuku mayoral election, which he won.

Taito district
The Taito district, which corresponds with Taito city, elects two members to the 127-member assembly. Liberal Democrat Yukuo Hattori, who was serving his third term in the assembly, resigned to contest the Taito mayoral election on 1 March 2015, which he won with 47.9% of the vote in a six-candidate contest.

References

2016 elections in Japan
July 2016 events in Japan
2016
2016 in Tokyo